Afaq TV is an Iraqi satellite television channel based in Baghdad, Iraq. The channel was launched in 2006. The channel is owned by Nouri al-Maliki.

See also

Television in Iraq

References

External links
 Afaq TV Official website

Television stations in Iraq
Arabic-language television stations
Television channels and stations established in 2006
Arab Spring and the media
Islamic Dawa Party